Trigonopterus dua is a species of flightless weevil in the genus Trigonopterus from Indonesia. The species was first described in 2014 by German coleopterologist Alexander Riedel,  in cooperation with entomologists Rene Tenzlerom, Michael Balke, Kahiyo Rakhmadiyev, and Yayyuk Suhardzhono to carry out an audit of the fauna of beetles of the genus Trigonopterus on the island of Java and the neighboring islands. Included in the group of the species Trigonopetrus -group with views trigonopterus aeneomicans , trigonopterus batukarensis, trigonopterus delapan, trigonopterus disruptus, trigonopterus empat, trigonopterus fissitarsis,  and other taxa.

Etymology
The specific name is derived from the Indonesian word for "two".

Description
Individuals measure 1.82–1.88 mm in length.  The body is slightly oval in shape.  General coloration black, with rust-colored tarsi and antennae.

Range

Phylogeny
T. dua is part of the T. saltator species group.

References

dua
Beetles described in 2014
Beetles of Asia
Insects of Indonesia